Patsy Cline's Greatest Hits is a compilation consisting of American country pop music singer, Patsy Cline's greatest hits. The album consists of Cline's biggest hits between 1957 and 1963. It is one of the biggest-selling albums in the United States by any female country music artist.

Background

Patsy Cline's Greatest Hits was released four years after her death in 1967 by Decca Records, Cline's longtime record label and the one with whom she'd had the most hits. Among its twelve tracks, the album contains seven of Cline's Top 10 country hits between 1957 and 1963.

In 1971, MCA consolidated the New York-based Decca and Kapp subsidiary labels, plus the California-based Uni label into MCA Records based in Universal City, California. The three labels maintained their identities for a short time but were retired in favor of the MCA label in 1973.

Upon  Cline's induction into the Country Music Hall of Fame in 1973, the album was reissued by MCA Records and went gold all over again. In 1988, the album was reissued again on a CD format with a different cover art and was retitled 12 Greatest Hits. In 2003, the album was digitally remastered and was reissued under MCA records again with the original 1967 cover art.
Bob Ludwig digitally remastered the album in 2003, making the album sound smoother in sound than it originally did before.

Chart performance & record sales
In 1967, the original album release peaked at #17 on the Billboard Top Country Albums chart. After the album was digitally remastered and reissued under the title, 12 Greatest Hits, the album charted again on the Top Country Albums chart at #27. No singles were spawned from the album.

In 1989, Patsy Cline's Greatest Hits was certified double-platinum (two million copies) by the RIAA, making Cline the first female ever in country music to have a double-platinum album.

The album is currently in Guinness World Records for staying the most weeks on the US Country Chart by a female artist. The album was still on the chart in 2001, 722 weeks after it originally entered the charts. .
By 2005, the album had sold 10 million copies in the United States, receiving a certification of 10× Multi-Platinum or Diamond by the Recording Industry Association of America. Making it easily the single highest selling album never to chart on the Billboard 200.
Patsy Cline's Greatest Hits was the largest-selling album by a female country artist up until Shania Twain's The Woman in Me sold 12 million copies in the United States.

Individual tracks
The album contains Patsy Cline's signature hits but also includes several songs that were never hits on the American Country or Pop Top 100 Charts.

"Walkin' After Midnight" was released in 1957 and reached #2 on the Country charts and #12 on the Billboard Top 100. It was released while Cline was still under her Four Star Records contract. The version on the Greatest Hits collection is a 1961 rerecording.

"Sweet Dreams" was released in 1963 following Cline's death. It reached #5 on the Billboard Country chart, #44 on the Billboard Hot 100 and #12 on Billboard Easy Listening.

"Crazy", by songwriter and singer Willie Nelson, was released by Cline in 1961. It went to #2 on Billboard's Country chart, #2 Easy Listening, and #9 on the Hot 100.

"I Fall To Pieces" was released in 1961; it was #1 on Billboard's Country chart, #12 on the Hot 100 and #6 Easy Listening.

"So Wrong" was released in 1962. It was one of Cline's lesser hits, reaching #14 Country and #85 on the Hot 100.

"Strange" was the B-side of "She Got You", released in 1962.

"Back in Baby's Arms" was the B-side of "Sweet Dreams", released following Cline's death in 1963. It was a #1 hit in Australia briefly in 1963.

"She's Got You" was released in 1962. It was #1 Country, #14 Hot 100, and #3 Easy Listening.

"Faded Love", a cover of a Bob Wills song, was released after Cline's death in 1963. It reached #7 on the U.S. Country charts and #96 on the Hot 100. It was first released on album on the Greatest Hits collection.

"Why Can't He Be You" was the B-side of Clines' 1962 single "Heartaches." It had minor chart success, reaching #7 on the US Bubbling Under Hot 100. It also reached the #107 position on the U.S. pop charts.

"You're Stronger Than Me" was the B-side to the 1962 single "So Wrong", which reached #103 Pop.   This collection contains a faster version recorded earlier but never released.

"Leavin' on Your Mind" was Cline's last single to be released before her death in 1963. It reached #8 Country and #83 on the Hot 100.

Charted songs that did not make this collection include: 
"A Poor Man's Roses" (1957 - #14 U.S. Country), 
"Who Can I Count On?" (1961 - #99 U.S. Pop), 
"When I Get Thru With You" (1962 - #10 U.S. Country / #52 U.S. Pop), 
"Imagine That" (1962 - #21 U.S. Country / #90 U.S. Pop), 
"You're Stronger Than Me" (b-side version) (1962 - #103 U.S. Pop), 
"Heartaches" (1962 - #73 U.S. Pop), "When You Need a Laugh" (1963 - #47 U.S. Country), 
"Someday" (1964 - #123 U.S. Pop), and "He Called Me Baby" (1964 - #23 U.S. Country).

Track listing

1967 and 1973 original LP version
Side 1

"Walkin' After Midnight" – 2:00 (Don Hecht, Alan Block)
"Sweet Dreams (of You)" – 2:33 (Don Gibson)
"Crazy" – 2:41 (Willie Nelson)
"I Fall to Pieces" – 2:47 (Hank Cochran, Harlan Howard)
"So Wrong" – 2:58 (Carl Perkins)
"Strange" – 2:10 (Fred Burch, Mel Tillis)

Side 2
"Back in Baby's Arms" – 2:00 (Bob Montgomery)
"She's Got You" – 2:58 (Cochran)
"Faded Love" – 3:43 (Bob Wills, John Wills)
"Why Can't He Be You" – 3:21 (Cochran)
"You're Stronger Than Me" – 2:51 (Cochran, Jimmy Key)
"Leavin' on Your Mind" – 2:34 (Wayne Walker, Webb Pierce)

1988 and 2003 CD version
The song lengths remain the same on the reissued releases.

"Walkin' After Midnight"
"Sweet Dreams (Of You)"
"Crazy"
"I Fall to Pieces"
"So Wrong"
"Strange"
"Back in Baby's Arms"
"She's Got You"
"Faded Love"
"Why Can't He Be You"
"You're Stronger Than Me"
"Leavin' on Your Mind"

Personnel
The album's tracks were recorded between November 16, 1960 and February 7, 1963 in Nashville, Tennessee.

 Harold Bradley – electric bass
 Patsy Cline – vocals
 Floyd Cramer – piano, organ
 Ray Edenton – rhythm guitar
 Hank Garland – electric guitar
 Buddy Harman – drums
 Walter Haynes – steel guitar
 Randy Hughes – rhythm guitar
 Joe Jenkins – acoustic bass
 The Jordanaires – background vocals
 Doug Kirkham – drums
 Millie Kirkham – background vocals
 Grady Martin – electric guitar
 Bob Moore – acoustic bass
 Bill Pursell – organ, vibraphone
 Hargus "Pig" Robbins – piano
 Rita Faye Wilson – autoharp

Charts
Album – Billboard (North America)

Year-end charts

See also
List of best-selling albums in the United States

References

External links
 Patsy Cline's Greatest Hits Amazon.com profile

Patsy Cline albums
Albums produced by Owen Bradley
1967 greatest hits albums
MCA Records compilation albums
Decca Records compilation albums